Lemke's Widow may refer to:
 Lemke's Widow (1928 film), a German silent film
 Lemke's Widow (1957 film), a West German comedy film